Pitt Meadows Regional Airport  is a Canadian general aviation airport located in the southwest of corner of Pitt Meadows, British Columbia. In 2021, the airport had 112,872 aircraft movements making it the 4th busiest airport in the Lower Mainland.

The first airport manager was Gordon McNeill 1966-1972. By 1972-1973, Pitt Meadows was the busiest airport in Canada with over 250,000 aircraft movements annually, but with the opening of Boundary Bay Airport in Delta, British Columbia in 1983, air traffic at Pitt Meadows Airport declined steadily.

In January 1998, the districts of Maple Ridge and Pitt Meadows jointly took custody from the federal government under the auspices of the Pitt Meadows Airport Society.

Nine flight training schools are located at the airport. The airport features three asphalt runways, three helipads, IFR approaches, and a separate float plane dock along the Fraser River. The Nav Canada air traffic control tower operates from 7:00 a.m. to 11:00 p.m. 365 days per year.

In 2019, the airport terminal was moved to make room for a new  two-level terminal building. The new terminal opened in January 2022.

Airlines and destinations

Charter airlines include:
 Air West Charters
 Fort Langley Air
 Harbour Air Seaplanes
 Island Coastal Aviation
 Pacific Rim Aviation Academy
 Sierra Helicopters
 Sky Helicopters
 Vancity Seaplanes
 Northern Rockies Lodge / Liard Air
 Canadian Flight Centre

Flight training

Flight training operations include:

 Canadian Aviation College
 Canadian Flight Centre
 Cardinal Aviation
 Classic Aviation
 Fort Langley Air
 Island Coastal Aviation
 Montair Aviation
 Pacific Rim Aviation Academy
 Vancouver Aviation College
 Executive Compass Flight Institute

See also
 List of airports in the Lower Mainland

References

External links
 Official website
 Pitt Meadows municipal website
 Page about this airport on COPA's Places to Fly airport directory

Airports in Greater Vancouver
Certified airports in British Columbia
Pitt Meadows